Bogatha Waterfall is a waterfall located on the Cheekupally stream, Wazeedu Mandal, Mulugu district, Telangana.

Of the waterfalls in Mulugu District, Telangana state, it is the second largest waterfall in the Telangana region.

Tourism
Even though water flows throughout the year, a good time to visit is between June and November (after the monsoon), when the most water flows. There is no road facility, so visitors have to trek for some distance to reach the waterfall.

Bogatha is colloquially called as "the Telangana Niagara" and "Telangana Niagara jalapatham".
its a nice scenery to go and visit there is a well maintained park and tower to see around

See also
 Kuntala Waterfall
 Pochera Falls

References

External links
 Bogatha Waterfall 
 About Bogatha Waterfall

Waterfalls of Telangana
Tourist attractions in Telangana
Khammam district